The 1950 Paris–Tours was the 44th edition of the Paris–Tours cycle race and was held on 7 May 1950. The race started in Paris and finished in Tours. The race was won by André Mahé.

General classification

References

1950 in French sport
1950
1950 Challenge Desgrange-Colombo
May 1950 sports events in Europe